is a Japanese manga series written and illustrated by Yu Aida. It was serialized in Shogakukan's seinen manga magazine Weekly Big Comic Spirits from August 2014 to March 2019.

Media

Manga
1518! is written and illustrated by Yu Aida. The series debuted in Weekly Big Comic Spirits on August 11, 2014. After various hiatuses that began in October 2015, the series continued in the magazine on a monthly basis starting in March 2017. The series finished on March 11, 2019. Shogakukan collected its chapters in seven tankōbon volumes, released from March 30, 2015 to April 12, 2019.

Volume list

Stage play
A stage play adaptation, titled  ran in Tokyo's Ikebukuro Theater Green from February 17–23, 2021.

Reception
1518! ranked #19 in the 4th Next Manga Award in the print category in 2018.

References

External links
 
 

Seinen manga
School life in anime and manga
Shogakukan manga